Brivio is a town and comune in the province of Lecco, in the Lombardy region of northern Italy. It is served by Olgiate-Calco-Brivio railway station.

Castles in Italy